Bliznakov is a Bulgarian surname. Notable people with the surname include:

Georgi Bliznakov (1920–2004), Bulgarian chemist
Mario Bliznakov (born 1982), Bulgarian footballer
Milka Bliznakov (1927–2010), Bulgarian architect
Nikolay Bliznakov (born 1950), Bulgarian journalist, publicist and politician
Veselin Bliznakov (born 1944), Bulgarian politician

Bulgarian-language surnames